Diána Zámbó (born 19 January 1978) is a retired Hungarian Paralympic swimmer. She participated at six Paralympic Games and won two medals, including one gold at the 1996 Summer Paralympics in Atlanta.

References

1978 births
Living people
Sportspeople from Székesfehérvár
People from Tatabánya
Paralympic swimmers of Hungary
Swimmers at the 1992 Summer Paralympics
Swimmers at the 1996 Summer Paralympics
Swimmers at the 2000 Summer Paralympics
Swimmers at the 2004 Summer Paralympics
Swimmers at the 2008 Summer Paralympics
Swimmers at the 2012 Summer Paralympics
Medalists at the 1992 Summer Paralympics
Medalists at the 1996 Summer Paralympics
Paralympic medalists in swimming
Paralympic gold medalists for Hungary
Paralympic bronze medalists for Hungary
Hungarian female butterfly swimmers
S5-classified Paralympic swimmers
Medalists at the World Para Swimming Championships